Bereznichek is a rural locality (a village) in Vinogradovsky District, Arkhangelsk Oblast, Russia. The population was 20 as of 2010. There are 2 streets.

Geography 
Bereznichek is located on the Vaga River, 33 km southeast of Bereznik (the district's administrative centre) by road. Vazhsky is the nearest rural locality.

References 

Rural localities in Vinogradovsky District